= M. W. Wade =

American photographer

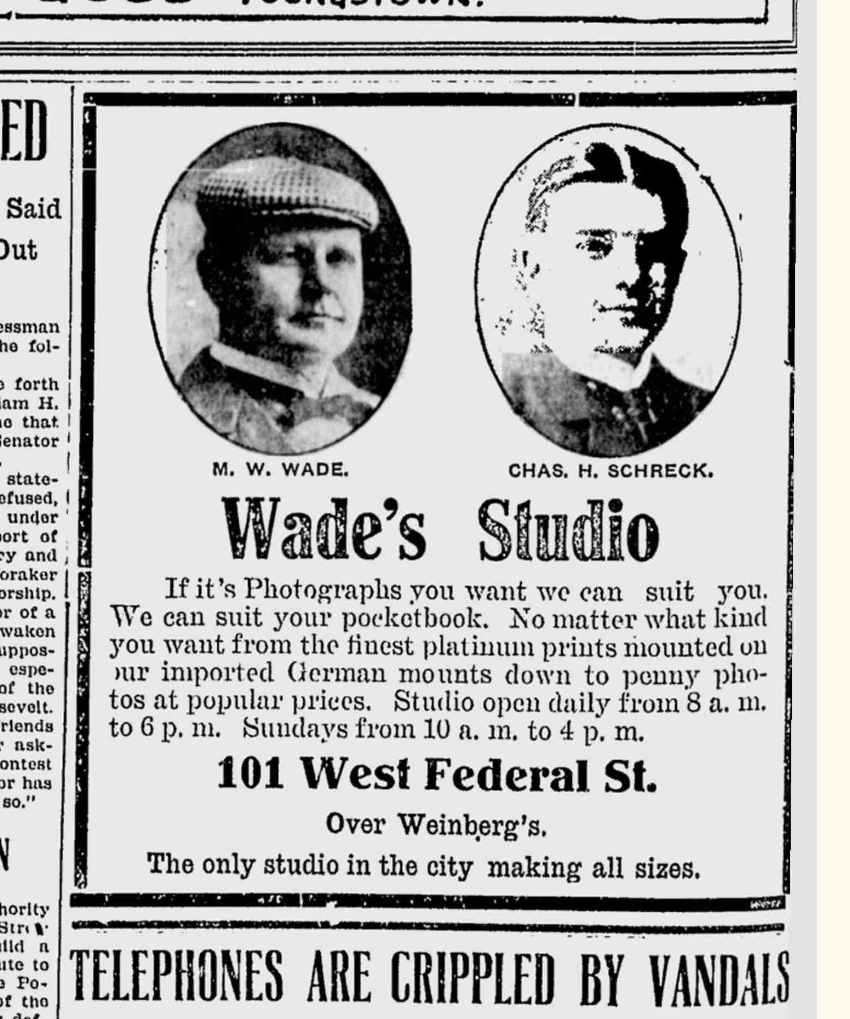
Advertisement for Wade's Photo Studio, Youngstown, Ohio, 1907

Madison W. Wade was an early American photographer through the late 19th to early 20th centuries. His pioneering photographic techniques of the 1890s led to the concept of the "Ping-Pong photo" which revolutionized the professional photographic studios of the early 1900s.

== Career ==
Wade came up with the original idea for producing ping-pong photographs, which he named the "little photos", while working for Chas. T. Pomeroy, a photographer from Kansas City, Mo. Wade began publicly selling his small portrait concept to the public on July 17, 1897. Over the next four years he produced over 500,000 of these photos. Wade then moved to Colorado, opening a photo studio in Denver. In 1901, Wade moved to Ohio and opened 5 galleries. The main gallery was located in Akron on 207 E. Market St. Of the remaining four, two were located in Columbus, one in Canton, and one in Massilon.

In 1904, Wade moved to Youngstown, Ohio and for the next 35 years operated "Wade's Studio" on W. Federal Street. His exact address on this street varied over time. The Ohio Business Directory includes records of the following locations of Wade's studio from 1908-1927: 17, 101, 103, and 105 W. Federal Street.

He was attributed in the August 10th, 1905 Youngstown Vindicator as holding the world's record for taking the most portrait photographs from 1897 to 1905. This was largely attributed to the popularity of his "little photos" concept. In addition, the article also stated "The first 6 months of this year [1905] in the neighborhooding city of New Castle he made sittings for fifteen thousand dozens photographs, the most phenomenal photographic run ever made in that city." [See "Noted Photographer Here" image this page].

Wade retired from photography in 1939 and died on April 17, 1943, at St. Francis Hospital in Columbus, Ohio.
